Lida District - a district (rajon) in Grodno Region of Belarus.

The administrative center is Lida.

Notable residents 
Vitold Ashurak (1970, Aharodniki village – 2021), Belarusian activist and political prisoner who died in custody
Kyprian Kandratovich (1859, Zinovičy village – 1932), military officer, commander of the armed forces of the short-lived Belarusian Democratic Republic

References

 
Districts of Grodno Region